"Carousel Man" is a song recorded by an American singer/actress Cher, released as a second and final single from the album Half-Breed. The single was commercially released only in the US. It charted on Billboard Adult Contemporary chart at #41, as well as on Canadian singles chart at #83.

Allmusic retrospectively praised the jiggling rhythm of the song and called it lighthearted.

Charts

References

Cher songs
1973 songs
Song recordings produced by Snuff Garrett
Articles containing video clips